Sebastián Losada Bestard (born 3 September 1967) is a Spanish retired footballer who played as a striker.

He amassed La Liga totals of 131 matches and 34 goals over nine seasons in representation of five teams, starting his career with Real Madrid.

Club career
A Real Madrid youth graduate, Madrid-born Losada made his first-team debut on 9 September 1984 in a 1–1 away draw against Sporting de Gijón, but would not have a successful period with the capital side. He did, however, score eight La Liga goals in just 16 appearances in the 1989–90 season as Real were crowned champions, adding the club's goal number 400 in the European Cup in a 2–2 draw at FC Tirol Innsbruck on 7 November 1990.

In 1987–88, Losada served a loan stint with RCD Español and netted eight top-division goals during the campaign, also helping the team to reach the UEFA Cup final: he scored twice in the first leg for the Catalans (3–0), but missed his penalty shootout attempt in the eventual loss against Bayer 04 Leverkusen.

Subsequently, Losada played for Atlético Madrid (frequently feuding with club president Jesús Gil), Sevilla FC – where he coincided with Diego Maradona– and RC Celta de Vigo. After retiring at only 27 he became a lawyer, and also unsuccessfully ran for president of the Royal Spanish Football Federation in 2004.

International career
Losada earned his only cap for the Spain national team on 18 January 1995, playing the second half of a 2–2 friendly draw with Uruguay in A Coruña. He also appeared for the under-20s at the 1985 FIFA World Youth Championship, scoring three goals in five matches for the runners-up.

Honours
Real Madrid
La Liga: 1988–89, 1989–90
Copa del Rey: 1988–89
Supercopa de España: 1990

Español
UEFA Cup runner-up: 1987–88

Spain U20
FIFA U-20 World Cup runner-up: 1985

Individual
FIFA U-20 World Cup Golden Shoe: 1985

References

External links

1967 births
Living people
Spanish footballers
Footballers from Madrid
Association football forwards
La Liga players
Segunda División players
Real Madrid Castilla footballers
Real Madrid CF players
RCD Espanyol footballers
Atlético Madrid footballers
Sevilla FC players
RC Celta de Vigo players
Spain youth international footballers
Spain under-21 international footballers
Spain international footballers